The men's 100 metre breaststroke competition of the swimming events at the 2011 World Aquatics Championships took place July 24 and 25. The heats and semifinals took place July 24 and the final was held July 25.

Records
Prior to the competition, the existing world and championship records were as follows.

Results

Heats

83 swimmers participated in 11 heats, qualified swimmers are listed:

 Mohammad Alirezaei pulled out of his heat because Israeli Gal Nevo was also scheduled to swim in the heat.  Iran does not recognize Israel as a country.

Semifinals
The semifinals were held 19:06.

Semifinal 1

Semifinal 2

Final
The final was held 19:27.

References

External links
2011 World Aquatics Championships: Men's 100 metre breaststroke entry list, from OmegaTiming.com; retrieved 2011-07-23.

Breaststroke 100 metre, men's
World Aquatics Championships